Dawn of Victory is the third studio album released by Rhapsody in 2000. Like the previous albums, it centers on the story of Algalord and The Emerald Sword Saga. It was produced and engineered by Sascha Paeth and Miro. It is also the first album to feature drummer Alex Holzwarth.

In 2019, Metal Hammer ranked it as the second best power metal album of all time.

Track listing

The album was also made available in a Digipak edition containing a bonus disc with several extra tracks.

The bonus disc also contained a multimedia track featuring:
Holy Thunderforce (video clip)
Epicus Furor – Emerald Sword (video clip)
Wisdom Of The Kings (video clip)
Algalord Chronicles I, II & III
Photo Gallery
Track Commentary
History
Screensaver (for PC use only)

Credits
 Luca Turilli – Guitars
 Fabio Lione – Vocals
 Alex Staropoli – Keyboards
 Alessandro Lotta – Bass
 Alex Holzwarth – Drums

Guest musicians 

 Epic choirs – Robert Hunecke-Rizzo, Thomas Rettke, Miro Rodenberg, Cinzia Rizzo, Florinda Klevisser
 Church Choirs – Helmstedt Kammerchoir conducted by Andreas Lamken
 Female Baroque voice – Constanze Backes
 Childish voice on "Trolls in the Dark" – Laurence Vanryne
 Baroque recorders – Manuel Staropoli
 Lead Violin – Maggie Ardorf
 Guest Drums – Thunderforce

Charts

References

External links 
 Lyrics

2000 albums
Rhapsody of Fire albums
Limb Music albums